Caroline Rohde-Moe (born 10 April 1992) is a Norwegian tennis player.

Rohde-Moe has a WTA singles career high ranking of 719 achieved on 3 August 2015. She also has a WTA doubles career high ranking of 540 achieved on 4 May 2015. Rohde-Moe has won two ITF doubles titles.

Playing for Norway in Fed Cup, Rohde-Moe has a W/L record of 10–5.

ITF finals (2-4)

Doubles (2–4)

Fed Cup participation

Singles

Doubles

External links 
 
 
 
 Ole Miss Rebels profile 

1992 births
Living people
Norwegian female tennis players
Sportspeople from Bærum
Ole Miss Rebels women's tennis players
21st-century Norwegian women